The Morecambe & Wise Show refers to a number of television and radio programmes starring the British comedy double act Morecambe and Wise.

Two of a Kind (British TV series), Morecambe and Wise's first television show for ITV, sometimes referred to as The Morecambe & Wise Show.
The Morecambe & Wise Show (1968 TV series), Morecambe & Wise's successful television show for the BBC
The Morecambe & Wise Show (1978 TV series), Morecambe & Wise's second television show for ITV

See also
The Eric Morecambe and Ernie Wise Show (1975–1978), on BBC Radio 2